Moonlit Sailor is a post-rock band from Borås, Sweden, formed in 2006. The group consisted of Joakim Wiik (keyboards/guitar), Oscar Gullbrandsen (guitar), Adam Törnblad (drums/guitar/piano), and Markus Rundlöf (bass).

In 2008 the band released their debut EP A Footprint of Feelings through the independent record label Deep Elm Records. The following year they released a full-length album, So Close to Life, and in 2010 they embarked on a small European tour that included stops in Germany, Austria, the United Kingdom, and Finland. The band released a second album in 2011, Colors in Stereo, also through Deep Elm Records.

On May 8, 2017, Törnblad died at the age of 27.

Discography

Albums
 2008: A Footprint of Feelings (Deep Elm Records)
 2009: So Close to Life (Deep Elm Records)
 2011: Colors In Stereo (Deep Elm Records)
 2014: We Come From Exploding Stars (Deep Elm Records)

References

External links
 

Swedish post-rock groups
Musical groups established in 2006
Swedish rock music groups